Gloria Edelmira Montenegro Figueroa (born 30 March 1956) is a Peruvian politician. She served as the Minister of Women and Vulnerable Populations in the presidency of Martín Vizcarra.

Early life and education
Montenegro was born on 30 March 1956 in La Unión, Huánuco. She grew up in Chiclayo then moved to Lambayeque, where she studied accounting and administration at the Universidad Nacional Pedro Ruiz Gallo.

Political career
In 2006, Montenegro was elected councilwoman (regidora) in Trujillo City Council; four years later she was elected deputy mayor of that city. In May 2014, she was appointed mayor of Trujillo (alcaldesa provincial) after her predecessor César Acuña resigned so that he could run for election to governor of the Department of La Libertad. She was mayor until the end of the year.

As a member of the Peruvian party Alliance for Progress, Montenegro was elected to congress in the 2016 elections in Peru. She was elected as a member for La Libertad for the legislative period from 28 July 2016 to 28 July 2021. On 11 March 2019, she was appointed Minister of Women and Vulnerable Populations, succeeding Ana María Mendieta.

After President Martín Vizcarra dissolved Congress on 30 September 2019, she and the other congressmembers lost their seats. Early new elections followed on 26 January 2020, in which the 130 seats in Congress were redistributed until the end of the legislative period. Montenegro was not re-elected. She remained Minister for Women and Vulnerable Populations until 6 August 2020. Three days earlier, Prime Minister Pedro Cateriano was ousted by a vote of no confidence. As a result, the new Prime Minister Walter Martos filled the cabinet. He appointed Rosario Sasieta to succeed Montenegro. In October 2020, she joined the Purple Party after having previously left the APP.

Citations

1956 births
Living people
People from Huánuco Region
Women government ministers of Peru
21st-century Peruvian women politicians
21st-century Peruvian politicians
Women's ministers of Peru